You're Me is an album by pianist Tommy Flanagan and bassist Red Mitchell.

Music and recording
The album was recorded on February 24, 1980, in New York City. The version of "Milestones" recorded is not the 1958 composition, but an earlier tune.

Track listing
"You're Me" (Red Mitchell) – 4:31  
"Darn That Dream" (Jimmy Van Heusen, Edgar DeLange) – 8:11  
"What Am I Here For?" (Duke Ellington, Frankie Laine) – 4:50  
"When I Have You" (Mitchell) – 7:31  
"All the Things You Are" (Jerome Kern, Oscar Hammerstein II) – 6:45  
"Milestones" (Miles Davis) – 4:59
"Whisper Not" (Benny Golson) – 6:54  
"There Will Never Be Another You" (Harry Warren, Mack Gordon) – 5:14

Personnel
Tommy Flanagan – piano
Red Mitchell – bass

References

1980 albums
Tommy Flanagan albums